The Old Haines City National Guard Armory (also known as the Community Center of Northeast Polk County, Inc.) is a historic site in Haines City, Florida. It is located at 226 South 6th Street. On March 2, 1994, it was added to the U.S. National Register of Historic Places.

References

External links
 Polk County listings at National Register of Historic Places
 Florida's Office of Cultural and Historical Programs
 Polk County listings
 Community Service Center of N.E. Polk County

National Register of Historic Places in Polk County, Florida
Haines City, Florida